Dagonville is a commune in the Meuse department in Grand Est in north-eastern France.

Population

The population of Dagonville has slowly declined since the beginning of census-taking in 1793; whereas the commune once (in 1851) housed as many as 356 people, as of 1999 it housed only 77.

See also
Communes of the Meuse department

References

Communes of Meuse (department)